Valse-Impromptu, S.213, is a waltz for solo piano composed by Franz Liszt in the key of A-flat major.

First published in 1852, the piece is believed to have been composed between 1842 and 1852. A longer and lesser-heard version, Valse-Impromptu with Later Additions (c. 1880, S.213a), was recorded for the first time by Australian pianist Leslie Howard as part of his complete recordings of Liszt's piano works. Depending on tempo, performances of the original Valse are approximately  minutes, while the extended version is about  minute longer.

Although it is not considered one of Liszt's better-known pieces, Valse-Impromptu has been recorded by such pianists as Josef Hofmann, Georges Cziffra (DVD) and Jorge Bolet, and frequently appears in collections of the composer's piano music.

References

External links 
 
 
 
 

Compositions by Franz Liszt
Compositions in A-flat major
Compositions for solo piano
1852 compositions